Alvaton is an unincorporated community in Warren County, Kentucky, United States. It is 9.5 miles southeast of Bowling Green, Kentucky on U.S. Route 231.

References

Unincorporated communities in Warren County, Kentucky
Unincorporated communities in Kentucky